Nancy Fichman is an American film and television writer, having worked on series such as Nurse Jackie and Damages. She also wrote the 2005 made-for-television movie The Dead Will Tell. She often works with her writing partner Jennifer Hoppe-House. The pair have two screenplays currently in development, Lost Girls and The Allegation.

Career

Film 
Fichman and Hoppe-House are the writers of an upcoming film entitled Fortune, which takes place in Las Vegas and tells the intersecting story of a petty thief  seeking a way out of his life after a roadside killing and two sisters who team up to collect a bounty on a mobster. The film, directed by Clark Johnson, was  shot in Canada on in August, 2011. The two also have two screenplays in development. The first, Lost Girls, revolves around a small-town lawyer in Canada defending a serial killer who begins to have flashbacks of crimes he may have committed in childhood. The second, The Allegation, tells the story of a marriage that begins to fall apart when their lives are interrupted by a blackmailer.

Television 
Fichman and Hoppe-House served as story editors and staff writers on the first two seasons of Nurse Jackie and as story editors on the fourth season of Damages. They contributed two scripts for each series.

Episodes of Nurse Jackie 
 Steak Knight (1.07)
 Bleeding (2.06)

Episodes of Damages 
 I've Done Way Too Much for This Girl (4.02)
 We'll Just Have to Find Another Way to Cut the Balls Off of This Thing (4.05)

Awards and nominations 
In 2009 and 2010, Fichman and Hoppe-House were nomination for a Writers Guild of America award. Both nominations were for their work on Nurse Jackie.

References

External links 

American television writers
Living people
American women television writers
Place of birth missing (living people)
Year of birth missing (living people)
21st-century American women